The Saudi Society of Dermatology and Dermatologic Surgery (in Arabic الجمعية السعودية لأمراض وجراحة الجلد), commonly abbreviated as SSDDS, (formerly The Saudi Society of Dermatology and Venereology), is a scientific organization that was established in 1989.

Dr. Sami Al Sogair has been attributed to the foundation of the society, who also stands as its president since 1989 until 1994.

In 1994, an SSDDS election installed Dr Omar AlSheikh as president, succeeded by Dr Sami Alsuwaidan.
Dr. Abdullah Sulaiman Alakeel is the current president of the society.

Activities
The 13th National Symposium of the SSDDS was held on 30–31 December 2009.

References

Dermatology organizations
1989 establishments in Saudi Arabia
Organizations established in 1989
Medical and health organisations based in Saudi Arabia